The 2001–02 Midland Football Combination season was the 65th in the history of Midland Football Combination, a football competition in England.

Premier Division

The Premier Division featured 18 clubs which competed in the division last season, along with four new clubs:
Clubs promoted from Division One:
Coleshill Town
County Sports
Shirley Town
Plus:
West Midlands Police, relegated from the Midland Football Alliance

Also:
Continental Star changed name to Handsworth Continental Star
Sutton Town changed name to Grosvenor Park

League table

References

2001–02
9